Jírova hora is a hill in the territory of Hronov in the Hradec Králové Region of the Czech Republic. It is situated between the villages of Zbečník, Rokytník and Velký Dřevíč.

Description
The eastern slope of the hill is very steep. The whole hill is covered mainly by coniferous forest (mainly spruce trees) and meadows. A deciduous forest grows on the southern slope, falling to Zbečník. A part of the forest on the top of the hill and the north slope is formed by young coniferous trees. A very small stream flows from the northern slope, from Rokytník to Velký Dřevíč. On the top of the hill there is a radio communications transmitter. In the western direction from the top of hill, construction of an artillery fort of the Czechoslovak border fortification system was planned prior to World War II.

Gallery

External links
Artillery on Jírova hora
Radiocommunication transmitter on Jírova hora
Elevation

Mountains and hills of the Czech Republic
Hronov